Unsaturated hydrocarbons are hydrocarbons that have double or triple covalent bonds between adjacent carbon atoms. The term "unsaturated" means more hydrogen atoms may be added to the hydrocarbon to make it saturated (i.e. consisting all single bonds). The configuration of an unsaturated carbons include straight chain, such as alkenes and alkynes, as well as branched chains and aromatic compounds.

Except for aromatic compounds, unsaturated hydrocarbons are mostly reactive and undergo multiple reactions to their multiple 
bonds.

Nomenclature 

For the sake of clearer communication and less misunderstanding, a consistent naming system is necessary, which gives rise to the IUPAC nomenclature.

Some standard steps to follow when naming unsaturated hydrocarbon molecules with IUPAC nomenclature are elaborated below.

1. Find and count the number of carbon atoms in the longest carbon chain and use the corresponding number prefix. For example, if the longest carbon chain contains three carbon atoms, use prefix “prop-”. The prefix of number of carbons from 1 to 10 is summarized in the table below.

2. Determine the suffix based on the type of hydrocarbon.
If one or more double bonds are present, use suffix “-ene”.
If one or more triple bonds are present, use suffix “-yne”.
If both double bonds and triple bonds are present, use both suffixes “-ene” and “-yne”. “-ene” usually goes before “-yne” as “e” is prior to “y” lexicographically.
3. Count the number of double bonds or triple bonds and indicate that by a number prefix before “-ene” or “-yne”. For example, a carbon chain with 4 carbon atoms containing 2 double bonds will be named as “butadiene”.
4. Add numbers between prefix of number of carbons and “-ene” or “-yne” to indicate the position of starting carbon of double bonds or triple bonds. For example, a carbon chain with 4 carbon atoms containing a double bond between the second carbon and the third carbon will be named as “but-2-ene”.
5. Lastly, use prefix before the prefix of number of carbons to indicate any side chains present. A straight carbon side chain is named simply by adding “-yl” after the prefix representing the number of carbon atoms in that chain. For example, if an ethyl group is attached to the second carbon in pent-2-ene, the molecule will be named as “2-ethylpent-2-ene”. For the naming of more complicated side chain, consult IUPAC nomenclature of organic chemistry. The side chain prefixes are added to the final name lexicographically, meaning an ethyl group will appear earlier than a methyl group.
If the compound is circular, use prefix “cyclo-”. For example, a carbon ring with 5 carbon atoms containing 1 double bond will be named as “cyclopentene”.

Structure

Isomerism 

In organic chemistry, cis- and trans- prefixes are used to describe the position of functional groups attached to carbon atoms in a double bond. In Latin, cis and trans mean "on this side of" and "on the other side of" respectively. Therefore, if the functional groups are on the same side of the carbon chain, the bond is assigned cis- configuration, otherwise (i.e. the functional groups are on the opposite side of the carbon chain), the bond is assigned trans- configuration.

The cis- and trans- configuration requires the existence of a carbon chain or that at least one functional group attached to each carbon is the same. E- and Z- configuration can be used instead in a more general case where all four functional groups attached to carbon atoms in a double bond are different. E- and Z- are the abbreviations of German words zusammen (together) and entgegen (opposite). In E- and Z- isomerism, each functional group is assigned a priority based on the Cahn–Ingold–Prelog priority rules. If the two groups with higher priority are on the same side of the double bond, the bond is assigned Z- configuration, otherwise (i.e. the two groups with higher priority are on the opposite side of the double bond), the bond is assigned E- configuration. Note that cis- and trans- configuration does not have a fixed relationship with E- and Z- configuration.

Orbital hybridization 

Carbon is known to have electron configuration of 1s2 2s2 2p2. As the only unpaired electrons it has are the two in the 2p orbitals, carbon is theoretically only capable of forming 2 single bonds. However, this is definitely not true as in reality, each carbon in ethene forms 2 single bonds and 1 double bond whereas each carbon in ethyne forms 1 single bond and 1 triple bond. In fact, it is the orbital hybridization that gives rise to this strange phenomenon.

In ethyne like molecules where carbon forms 1 triple bond and 1 single bond, the carbon atom undergoes sp hybridization, meaning the 2s orbital and one 2p orbital are combined to form two sp orbitals, and the other two 2p orbitals left remain unchanged. The angle between the two sp orbitals is 180°, and the first unchanged 2p orbital is perpendicular to the two sp orbitals while the second unchanged 2p orbital is perpendicular to both the two sp orbitals and the first unchanged 2p orbital. The 4 electrons from 2s and 2p orbitals are distributed equally among the two sp orbitals and two 2p orbitals (i.e. one electron in each orbital). During bond formation, one sp orbital from carbon forms a single σ bond with one other atom, and at the same time, the remaining one sp orbital and two 2p orbitals form a σ bond as well as two π bonds (a triple bond) with another atom, resulting in a linear molecular geometry.

In ethene like molecules where carbon form 1 double bond and 2 single bonds, the carbon atom undergoes sp2 hybridization, meaning the 2s orbital and two 2p orbitals are combined to form three sp2 orbitals, and the one 2p orbital left remains unchanged. The three sp2 orbitals are in the same plane with a 60° angle between each two of them, and the unchanged 2p orbital is perpendicular to all three sp2 orbitals. The 4 electrons from 2s and 2p orbitals are distributed equally among the three sp2 orbitals and the unchanged 2p orbital (i.e. one electron in each orbital). During bond formation, two sp2 orbitals from carbon form two separate single σ bonds with two other atoms respectively, and at the same time, the remaining one sp orbital and the unchanged 2p orbital form a σ bond as well as a π bond (a double bond) with another atom, resulting in a trigonal planar molecular geometry.

There is also sp3 hybridization where the 2s orbital and all three 2p orbitals are combined to form four sp3 orbitals. A carbon with sp3 hybridization will have tetrahedral molecular geometry and is therefore saturated.

Degree of unsaturation 

Degree of unsaturation is a calculation used to measure the number of π bonds in an unsaturated organic molecule. In a common compound composed of carbon, hydrogen, oxygen, nitrogen, and halogen, the degree of unsaturation formula can be expressed in the following way:
DU = 
C = number of carbon atoms in the compound
N = number of nitrogen atoms in the compound
F = number of halogen atoms in the compound
H = number of hydrogen atoms in the compound
the number of oxygen atoms or any other divalent atoms does not contribute to the degree of unsaturation

The degree of unsaturation also stands for that at most 2×DU hydrogen atoms can be added to the compound to make it saturated.

Physical properties

Boiling and melting point 
This is a list showing the boiling points and melting points of saturated and unsaturated hydrocarbons with same number of carbons.

Just like their saturated counterparts, the unsaturated hydrocarbons are usually non-polar. This means the intermolecular forces between unsaturated hydrocarbon molecules are dominantly weak Van der Waals force. The boiling point and melting point of unsaturated hydrocarbons are usually similar as their saturated counterparts with same number of carbon.

The melting and boiling points of unsaturated hydrocarbons compared to saturated ones are determined by two opposing factors. On the one hand, the strength of Van der Waals force depends on the number of electrons in a molecule. Unsaturated hydrocarbons have less electrons than saturated ones, so the boiling and melting point may decrease as intermolecular force decreases. On the other hand, the delocalized π electrons existing in the unsaturated hydrocarbons make the electron flow more easily within one molecule, so temporary dipoles are easier to form. Thus, the Van der Waals force may also increase due to delocalization of electrons. It turns out that alkynes are more affected by electron delocalization and usually have higher boiling points than alkanes with the same number of carbon. Alkenes are more affected by number of electrons and have lower boiling points than alkanes.

The boiling and melting points also depend on the stereochemistry. The cis alkenes, due to their U-bending shape, cannot arrange themselves as closely as the trans ones, so they will have lower boiling and melting points.

For longer chains of unsaturated hydrocarbons, the effects above still apply. In longer chains, the stereochemical "zig-zag" effect of unsaturated hydrocarbons become the dominant effect, so unsaturated long chain hydrocarbons usually have lower boiling and melting points. The melting point difference between saturated and unsaturated fat inside human body also leads to health issues.

Solubility 
Unsaturated hydrocarbons are also non-polar which makes them have low solubility in water. They are easier to dissolve in non-polar organic solvents such as benzene.

Spectroscopic Properties 
Compared to saturated hydrocarbons, the unsaturated hydrocarbons not only contains the C−C bonds and C−H bonds, but also have C=C double bonds and C≡C triple bonds. As a result, the spectrum will also contain characteristics of these π bondings. Similar as alkanes, the spectroscopy of unsaturated hydrocarbons will not shows the characteristics of other functional groups such as alcohol(−OH) and carboxylic acid(−COOH).

Infrared Spectroscopy 
The stretching of C=C bond will give an IR absorption peak at 1670–1600 cm−1, while the bending of C=C bond absorbs between 1000 and 650 cm−1 wavelength. The stretching of C≡C bond absorbs 2100–2140 cm−1(monosubstituted) and 2190–2260 cm−1(disubstituted). The strength of these absorption peaks varies with the place and number of the double or triple bonds.

Because of the delocalized π electrons in aromatic groups, the bending of C=C bond in these groups usually absorbs between 1500 and 1700 cm−1.

At the mean time, the absorption peaks of C–H and C–C bond, which are shared with the saturated hydrocarbons, also shows in the IR spectrum of unsaturated hydrocarbons.

NMR Spectroscopy 
In 1H NMR spectroscopy, the hydrogen bonded to the carbon adjacent to double bonds will give a δH of 4.5–6.5 ppm. The double bond will also deshield the hydrogen attached to the carbons adjacent to sp2 carbons, and this generates δH=1.6–2. ppm peaks. Aromatic groups will have δH=6.5–8.5 ppm peaks. Since the π bondings will make cis/trans isomers, the unsaturated hydrocarbon isomers will appear differently due to different J-coupling effect. Cis vicinal hydrogens will have coupling constants in the range of 6–14 Hz, whereas the trans will have coupling constants of 11–18 Hz.

In 13C NMR spectroscopy, compared to the saturated hydrocarbons, the double and triple bonds also deshiled the carbons, making them have low field shift. C=C double bonds usually have chemical shift of about 100–170 ppm.

Chemical Properties

Combustion 
Like most other hydrocarbons, unsaturated hydrocarbons can go under combustion reactions that produces carbon dioxide and water in complete combustion. The reaction equation is:
CxHy + O2 → H2O + xCO2

In the absence of oxygen, the combustion will turn into incomplete combustion and produce carbon monoxide and carbon.

The unsaturated hydrocarbons will produce incomplete combustion product more easily than saturated ones. As a result, the combustion of unsaturated hydrocarbons usually have yellow flame, different from the blue flame of the saturated ones. This indicates unsaturated hydrocarbon combustion will involve multi-step mechanisms, and the burning of carbon gives the yellow flame color.

Since unsaturated hydrocarbons have less hydrogen content, it will produce less water and decrease the flame moisture, as well as decrease the oxygen use. Acetylene(ethyne), for example, can be used as fuel.

Compared to the single σ C−C bonds in the saturated hydrocarbons, the unsaturated ones have electron density in the π bonds, which do not have much electron density overlapping as the σ. As a result, the chemical energy stored in one double bond is less than in two single bonds. Thus, the combustion of unsaturated hydrocarbons, which breaks the carbon–carbon bonds to release energy, release less energy than burning same molarity of saturated ones with same number of carbons. 
This trend can be clearly seen in the list of standard enthalpy of combustion of hydrocarbons.

Electrophilic Addition  
The double or triple bonds that must present in unsaturated hydrocarbons provide high electron density that make the molecules become perfect spots for electrophilic addition reactions. In this kind of reaction, one π bond between carbons will break into 2 separate σ bonds between each carbon and the added group. A carbocation intermediate is usually involved in the mechanism.

Hydrogenation 

Hydrogenation is the electrophilic addition of hydrogen gas to unsaturated hydrocarbon. The result will be a more saturated hydrocarbon, but not necessarily become a saturated one. For instance, semihydrogenation of an alkyne may form an alkene. Nonetheless, the total number of π bond must decrease in the process. The π carbon–carbon bond is also necessary for this process.

The reaction equation of hydrogenation of ethene to form ethane is:
H2C=CH2 + H2→H3C−CH3

The hydrogenation reaction usually requires catalysts to increase its rate.

The total number of hydrogen that can be added to an unsaturated hydrocarbon depends on its degree of unsaturation. An unsaturated hydrocarbon with formula of CXHY can have 2X+2−Y hydrogen atoms at most added to it. This will make the molecule become saturated.

Halogenation 

Similar as hydrogen, the heterolysis of halogen(X2) will produce an electrophilic X+ ion, after which it will be attacked by the electron on the π bond. Different from hydrogen, halogenation will produce halonium ions as intermediate instead of carbocations in most other cases. The halonium cation leaves limited space for the X− ion to attack and will only turn into a trans product. The net result of halogenation is a decrease of one π bond and an increase two carbon-halogen σ bonds on the 2 carbons.

The reaction equation for bromine addition of ethene, for example, is:
H2C=CH2 + Br2→H2CBr−CH2Br (trans)

Bromine test is used to test the saturation of hydrocarbons. The test involves the addition of bromine water to the unknown hydrocarbon; If the bromine water is decolourized by the hydrocarbon, which is due to halogenation reaction, it can then be concluded that the hydrocarbon is unsaturated. If it is not decolourized, then it is saturated.

The bromine test can also be used as an indication of the degree of unsaturation for unsaturated hydrocarbons. Bromine number is defined as gram of bromine able to react with 100g of product. Similar as hydrogenation, the halogenation of bromine is also depend on the number of π bond. A higher bromine number indicates higher degree of unsaturation.

Hydration 

The π bond of unsaturated hydrocarbons are also ready to accept H+ and OH− from water. The reaction usually involves strong acid as catalyst. That is because the first step of mechanism of hydration involves the π bond deprotonate a H+ from the strong acid to form a carbocation. The net result of the reaction will be an alcohol.

The reaction equation for hydration of ethene is:
H2C=CH2 + H2O→

The π bonds in triple bond are also able to go under hydration in acidic condition and form enols. However, the enol will not be a product but an intermediate, and the final product will be a ketone. The enol intermediate goes under tautomerization and form the more stable ketone.

The reaction equation of hydration of ethyne to form acetaldehyde is:
HC≡CH + H2O → H2C=CH−OH
H2C=CH−OH ⇌ H3C−CHO

Hydrohalogenation 

The hydrohalogenation involves addition of H−X to unsaturated hydrocarbons. This will decrease one π C=C bond and result in 2 C−H and C−X σ bonds with 2 separate carbons. The formation of the intermediate carbocation is selective and follows the Markovnikov's rule. The hydrohalogenation of alkene will result in haloalkane, and hydrohalogenation of alkyne will result in vinyl halide. The hydrohalogenation of alkyne is much slower than the alkene.

The reaction equation of HBr addition to ethene is:
H2C=CH2 + HBr→

Oxidation 

Oxidation of unsaturated hydrocarbons depends on the strength of oxidizing agent. A weak oxidizing agent will lead to dihydroxylation, removal of one π bond to form two σ bonds with oxygen. Dihydroxylation of alkene produces diol, and dihydroxylation of alkyne produces vicinal dicarbonyl.

A stronger oxidizing agent, for example KMnO4 or ozone, will lead to oxidative cleavage. In this case, the π bond breakes with the σ bond, dividing the hydrocarbon molecule into two. Oxygen bonds with the remaining two π bonds separately. Oxidative cleavage of alkene produces ketones or aldehydes, depending on the place of double bond, and cleavage of alkynes produces carboxylic acid.

Allylic substitution 
The π bond in unsaturated hydrocarbons will lower the dissociation energy of the allylic C−H bonds, which are C−H bonds of the carbon that is adjacent to the sp2 carbons. As a result, the free radical substitution reaction will be favored over the addition reactions.

An example of this is NBS bromination reaction with alkene. The N−Br bond in NBS is weak so that much Br free radical will form. The free radical will attack the weakened allylic hydrogens and substitute them with bromine atoms. The reaction equation is:
RCH2CH=CH2 + (CH2CO)2NBr → RCHBrCH=CH2 + RCH=CHCH2Br + (CH2CO)2N

The reaction will produce two isomers with bromine attached to different carbons. The reaction requires high amount of Br free radicals instead of electrophilic Br+ ions, which will go under addition reaction. NBS is essential to make such condition.

If hydrocarbon groups are attached to allylic carbon, it will make this carbon be more saturated. According to Zaitsev's Rule, this carbon will form a more stable carbocation intermediate. As a result, allylic rearrangement will occur, and the π bond will move to this carbon. This will produce a major product of bromine substituted to the carbon four bonds away from the hydrocarbon group.

Cycloaddition 

For unsaturated hydrocarbons, ring structure and π bonds can both increase the degree of unsaturation, interchange between ring structure and π bonds may occur under special conditions. For instance, for a conjugated diene and a substituted alkene, Diels-Alder reaction will occur that forms a cyclohexene. Such reaction is highly selective in stereochemistry.

Alkynes, under metal catalysts, for example cobalt, can also go under cycloaddition reaction called alkyne trimerization. Three alkynes goes under a "2+2+2" cyclization reaction and rapidly join to form a benzene. Trimerization of different alkenes are usually not selective, but specially designed catalysts may increase the selectivity.

React as ligand 

The delocalized π bond in unsaturated hydrocarbons provide high electron density, making the molecule possible to become a metal ligand. In alkene ligand, the bonding structure can be described by Dewar–Chatt–Duncanson model. In this case, the π electron density are donated to the metal d orbitals. The stronger the donation is, the stronger the back bonding from the metal d orbital to π* anti-bonding orbital of the alkene. This effect reduces the bond order of the alkene and increases the C-C bond length. As a result, the metal forms a small ring structure with the two carbons.

The DCD model can also describe the alkyne ligand structure. Metal complex can also be intermediate of trimerization of alkynes, so metals can be catalysts of the reaction.

The synthesis of alkene ligand complexes can be described as an electrophilic addition reaction.

Similar as linear unsaturated hydrocarbons, the arene also have delocalized π bonds able to donate to metals to form complex. In cases like benzene, the carbons donate equally electron density to the metal, whereas in some other cases, carbons donate differently to the metal, causing the arene to bent or dearomatize.

Application 
Unsaturated hydrocarbons are widely used as pesticides, fuel, paints, and many other necessities. Below is a table of some common commercial unsaturated hydrocarbons. 

Unsaturated hydrocarbons are also used in many chemical reactions to synthesize other compounds. One of their utility in this area is to be used as monomers in polymerization reactions. In these reactions, simple monomer unit molecules react and bind with each other either linearly or nonlinearly to synthesize macromolecules, yielding either polymer chains or 3D structures. During polymerization, the double bond in the monomers usually turns into a single bond so that two other monomer molecules can attach on both sides. Some products of polymerization reactions are closely related to our daily life. For example, one of the common types of plastic, polyethylene, is the polymerization product of ethylene. Also, Styrofoam (polystyrene) is the synthesized from the polymerization of styrene.

See also
Saturated hydrocarbon

References

Hydrocarbons